The 2016 Oceania Qualification Tournament for Rio Olympic Games took place in 27 February 2016 at the Taurama Aquatic & Leisure Centre in Port Moresby, Papua New Guinea. The winners of each of the eight categories qualifies for the Olympics.

Athletes from Australia, New Zealand, Papua New Guinea and Tonga qualified for the Olympics.

Medalists

Men

Women

Qualification summary

Results

Men

−58 kg

−68 kg

−80 kg

+80 kg

Women

−49 kg

−57 kg
  qualified automatically.

−67 kg

+67 kg
  qualified automatically.

References

Oceania Olympic Qualification
Taekwondo Olympic Qualification
Taekwondo Olympic Qualification
Taekwondo qualification for the 2016 Summer Olympics